Khu Mangpoje Lhasung (? – 705), also known as Khu Mangpoje, was a general of the Tibetan Empire. In Chinese records, his name was given as Qū Mǎngbùzhī.

After Tridu Songtsen purged Gar clan, he was sent to the east border to defense against Tang China. It proved that he was a general did not have military talents and was lack of experience in the later days. He invaded Liangzhou and put Changsong (昌松, in modern Wuwei) under siege in 700, in order to vanquish Tibetan troops led by the traitor Gar Tsenba, but was utterly beaten by Chinese general Tang Xiujing. He lost his two adjutants in this battle.

Tridu Songtsen died in 704 in 'Jang (Nanzhao), and Nepal and Se rib revolted. Mongpoje was appointed as Lönchen to put down the rebellion, but he tried to overthrow the powerful empress regent Thrimalö. He was captured and executed, his position turned to another general named We Trisig Shangnyen. Thrimalö had his property confiscated in 707.

References
Old Tibetan Annals (version I), I.T.J. 0750
Old Tibetan Chronicle, P.T. 1287
New Book of Tang, vol. 230

|-

7th-century Tibetan people
People of the Tibetan Empire
705 deaths
Tang–Tibet relations